The West Field is located on the Giza Plateau, to the west of the Great Pyramid of Giza. It is divided up into smaller areas like the cemeteries known as the Abu Bakr Excavations (1949–50, 1950–51, 1952 and 1953), as well as several cemeteries whose toponyms are based on the mastaba numbers such as Cemetery G 1000 and Cemetery G 1100. The West Field contains Cemetery G1000 – Cemetery G1600, and Cemetery G 1900. Further cemeteries in this field are: Cemeteries G 2000, G 2200, G 2500, G 3000, G 4000, and G 6000. Three other cemeteries are named after their excavators: Junker Cemetery West, Junker Cemetery East and Steindorff Cemetery.

Cemetery G1000

Cemetery G 1100

Cemetery G 1200

Cemetery G 1400

Cemetery G 1500

Cemetery G 1600

Cemetery G 2100

Cemetery G 2100 was first excavated by Lepsius in 1842. The first tomb to be cleared was the mastaba owned by Merib (G 2100). In 1905/6 the Harvard-Boston Museum expedition excavated this cemetery and further excavations date to 1912-13 and 1931–32. The cemetery consists of four rows of large mastabas:
 The westernmost row consists of the mastabas of Merib (G 2100 I), Sedit (G 2100) and Nefer (G 2110).
 A second row consists of the mastabas of Seshatsekhentiu (G 2120), Khentka (G 2130).
 The third row consists of mastabas G 2135 (Unknown), G 2140 (Unknown) and G 2150 (Kanefer)
 The fourth row consists of the mastabas of Kaninisut I (G 2155) and G 2160 and G 2170 (both owners unknown)
The other smaller mastabas were built among these larger structures. The presence of Reserve heads and slab stela points to the reign of Khufu for the construction of the earliest of the tombs in this cemetery.

Cemetery G 2300

The family complex of Senedjemib Inti makes up an important part of this cemetery. Senedjemib Inti (G 2370) was vizier and chief architect to King Djedkare Isesi. His son Senedjemib Mehi (G 2378) followed in his footsteps as the vizier and chief architect under Unas, and eventually another son named Khnumenti (G 2374) became vizier under Teti. A man named Mer-ptah-ankh-meryre Nekhebu (G 2381) may be a grandson of Inti. Nekhebu's sons Mer-ptah-ankh-meryre Ptahshepses Impy and Sabu-ptah Ibebi were buried in this cemetery as well.

Cemetery G 4000

Cemetery G 5000

Junker Cemetery East

This cemetery was excavated by Hermann Junker for the Akademie der Wissenschaften in Vienna, Pelizaeus-Museum Hildesheim and University of Leipzig Expedition. The tombs are not numbered and are named after their owner.

Steindorff Cemetery

This cemetery contains mostly brick-built mastabas. The cemetery was excavated by Georg Steindorff for the University of Leipzig and Pelizaeus Expedition (1903–07). Several of the tombs were later excavated by Hermann Junker.

See also
 Giza East Field

References

External links
 The Giza Archives Website maintained by the Museum of Fine Arts in Boston. Quote: "This website is a comprehensive resource for research on Giza. It contains photographs and other document
ation from the original Harvard University - Boston Museum of Fine Arts Expedition (1904 to 1947), from recent MFA fieldwork, and from other expeditions, museums, and universities around the world.".

Giza pyramid complex
Archaeological sites in Egypt
Ancient Egypt
Cemeteries in Egypt